The golden vireo (Vireo hypochryseus) is a species of bird in the family Vireonidae. It is endemic to Mexico. Its natural habitats are subtropical or tropical dry forests and subtropical or tropical moist lowland forests.

References

golden vireo
Endemic birds of Western Mexico
golden vireo
golden vireo
Taxonomy articles created by Polbot
Taxobox binomials not recognized by IUCN